The 1970 College Football All-America team is composed of college football players who were selected as All-Americans by various organizations and writers that chose College Football All-America Teams in 1970. The National Collegiate Athletic Association (NCAA) recognizes six selectors as "official" for the 1970 season. They are: (1) the American Football Coaches Association (AFCA), (2) the Associated Press (AP), (3) the Central Press Association (CP), (4) Football Writers Association of America (FWAA), (5) the Newspaper Enterprise Association (NEA), and (6) the United Press International (UPI).

AP, UPI, NEA, and Central Press were all press organizations that polled writers and players.  FWAA was also a poll of writers, as was the Walter Camp Foundation.  The AFCA was a poll of college coaches.  The Sporting News and Time polled football scouts and coaches.  AP, UPI, NEA, Central Press, and The Sporting News chose both first and second teams.  AP, UPI, NEA, and Central Press also listed numerous honorable mentions.

Consensus All-Americans
The following chart identifies the NCAA-recognized consensus All-Americans for the year 1970 and displays which first-team designations they received.

Offense

Ends 

 Tom Gatewood, Notre Dame (AFCA, CP-1 [end], FWAA [end], NEA-1, UPI-1 [end], FN, WC)
 Elmo Wright, Houston  (AP-1, FWAA [end], NEA-1, UPI-2 [end], FN, PFW, Time, TSN)
 Ernie Jennings, Air Force (AFCA, AP-1, CP-1 [end], FWAA [flanker], NEA-2, UPI-1 [end], FN)
 Chuck Dicus, Arkansas   (AFCA, CP-2 [end], NEA-2, FN, WC)
 J. D. Hill, Arizona State (PFW, Time, TSN)
 Terry Beasley, Auburn (AP-2, CP-2 [end], NEA-2 [tight end], UPI-2 [end], FN)
 Cotton Speyrer, Texas  (WC)
 Bobby Newland, Oregon (AP-2)

Tight ends 

 Jan White, Ohio State (NEA-1, Time, TSN)
 Jim Braxton, West Virginia (AP-1)
 Larry Brown, Kansas (PFW)
 Bob Moore, Stanford (AP-2)

Tackles 

 Dan Dierdorf, Michigan (AFCA, AP-1, CP-2, FWAA, NEA-1, UPI-1, FN, PFW, Time, WC)
 Bobby Wuensch, Texas (AFCA, AP-2, CP-1, NEA-1, UPI-1, FN, WC)
 Bob Newton, Nebraska  (AFCA, AP-1, CP-1, FWAA, NEA-2 [guard], UPI-2, FN)
 Vernon Holland, Tenn State (PFW, Time, TSN)
 Marv Montgomery, USC  (Time, TSN)
 Larron "Larry" Jackson, Missouri (AP-2, NEA-2, UPI-2)
 Worthy McClure, Mississippi (CP-2, NEA-2)

Guards 

 Chip Kell, Tennessee (AFCA, AP-1, CP-1, FWAA, NEA-1, UPI, FN, WC)
 Larry DiNardo, Notre Dame (AP-1, CP-1, FWAA, NEA-2, UPI, FN, TSN, WC)
 Hank Allison, San Diego St.  (AP-2, NEA-1, PFW, Time, TSN)
 Mike Sikich, Northwestern (CP-2, UPI-2)
 Gary Venturo, Arizona St. (CP-2, UPI-2)
 Dave Thompson, Clemson (AP-2)

Centers 

 Don Popplewell, Colorado (AP-1, CP-1, FWAA, NEA-1, UPI, FN, WC)
 Dave Thompson, Clemson  (PFW, Time, TSN)
 Wimpy Winther, Mississippi  (PFW)
 John Sande, Stanford (NEA-2, UPI-2)
 Bob Herb, William & Mary (AP-2)
 Tommy Lyons, Georgia (CP-2)

Quarterbacks 

 Jim Plunkett, Stanford (AFCA, AP-2, CP-1, FWAA, NEA-1, UPI, FN, Time, TSN, WC)
 Joe Theismann, Notre Dame (AP-1, CP-2, NEA-2, UPI-2, FN)

Running backs 

 Steve Worster, Texas  (AFCA, AP-1, CP-2 [fullback], FWAA, NEA-1, UPI, FN, Time, TSN, WC)
 Don McCauley, North Carolina (AFCA, AP-1, CP-1, FWAA, UPI-2, FN, WC)
 John Brockington, Ohio State (AP-2, CP-1 [fullback], NEA-2, UPI-1, FN, PFW, Time, TSN)
 Ed Marinaro, Cornell (AP-2, CP-1, UPI-1, FN)
 Leon Burns,  Long Beach St.  (NEA-1, PFW)
 Johnny Musso, Alabama (CP-2, FN, WC)
 Willie Armstrong, Grambling (PFW)
 Mike Adamle, Northwestern (UPI-2, FN)
 Leo Hayden, Ohio State (PFW)
 Vince Clements, Connecticut (NEA-2)
 Joe Moore, Missouri (UPI-2)
 Joe Orduna, Nebraska (CP-2)

Defense

Ends 

 Bill Atessis, Texas (AFCA, AP-1, CP-1, NEA-1, UPI-1, FN, PFW, Time, TSN)
 Charlie Weaver, USC (AFCA, AP-1, CP-2, FWAA, NEA-2, UPI-1, FN, Time, WC)
 Jack Youngblood, Florida (AP-2, CP-1, FWAA, UPI-2, FN, PFW, Time, TSN, WC)
 Richard Harris, Grambling (PFW, Time, TSN)
 Tody Smith, USC (PFW, Time)
 Herb Orvis, Colorado (AP-2, NEA-2, UPI-2)
 Mike Kuhn, Kansas St. (CP-2)

Tackles 

 Rock Perdoni, Georgia Tech (AFCA, AP-1, CP-1, FWAA, NEA-2, UPI-1, FN, TSN, WC)
 Dick Bumpas, Arkansas (AP-1, NEA-1 [end])
 Tom Neville, Yale (CP-2, WC)
 Bruce James, Arkansas (FWAA)
 Joe Ehrmann, Syracuse (UPI-1)
 Jim Poston, South Carolina  (CP-1)
 Win Headley, Wake Forest (NEA-1)
 Mel Long, Toledo (NEA-1)
 David Rolley, Kentucky (NEA-2)
 Dave Walline, Nebraska (UPI-2)
 Today Smith, USC (UPI-2)
 Craig Hanneman, Oregon St. (AP-2)
 John Sage, LSU (AP-2)
 Bob Bell, Cincinnati (CP-2)

Middle guards 

 Jim Stillwagon, Ohio State (AFCA, AP-1, CP-1 [guard], FWAA, NEA-1, UPI-1 [linebacker], FN, WC)
 Henry Hill, Michigan  (AP-2 [guard], CP-1 [guard], NEA-2 [MG])
 George Smith, Nebraska (CP-2 [guard])
 Roger Roitsch, Rice (CP-2 [guard])

Linebackers 

 Jack Ham, Penn State  (AFCA, AP-1, CP-2, FWAA, NEA-1, UPI-1, FN, PFW, Time, TSN, WC)
 Mike Anderson, LSU   (AFCA, AP-1, CP-1, FWAA, NEA-2, UPI-1, FN)
 Isiah Robertson, Southern University (Time, TSN)
 Jerry Murtaugh, Nebraska (AP-1, CP-2, UPI-2, FN, WC)
 Jackie Walker, Tennessee (AP-2, NEA-1, UPI-2, FN)
 Dale Farley, West Virginia (PFW, TSN)
 Marty Huff, Michigan (AFCA, UPI-2)
 Scott Henderson, Texas (CP-1)
 Richard Slough, USC (PFW)
 Charlie Hall, Houston (NEA-2)
 Phil Croyle, California (AP-2)
 Rick Kingrea, Tulane (AP-2)

Backs 
 Jack Tatum, Ohio State (AFCA, AP-1, CP-1, FWAA, NEA-1, UPI-1, FN, PFW, Time, TSN, WC)
 Larry Willingham, Auburn (AFCA, CP-1, FWAA, NEA-1 [linebacker], FN, PFW, Time, TSN, WC)
 Dave Elmendorf, Texas A&M (AP-1, FWAA [safety], NEA-2 [linebacker], UPI-2)
 Tommy Casanova, LSU (AFCA, AP-1, CP-2, UPI-2)
 Clarence Scott, Kansas State (FWAA, NEA-2, PFW, Time, TSN)
 Dickie Harris, South Carolina   (AFCA, CP-2, NEA-1, FN)
 Mike Sensibaugh, Ohio State (AP-2, CP [safety], UPI-1)
 Tim Anderson, Ohio State (NEA-2, Time, TSN)
 Clarence Ellis, Notre Dame (NEA-1, UPI-1)
 Murry Bowden, Dartmouth  (AFCA, WC)
 Pat Murphy, Colorado (WC)
 Bivian Lee, Prairie View (PFW)
 Jerry Moore, Arkansas  (PFW, NEA-2, TSN-2)
 Bobby Majors, Tennessee (UPI-2)
 Windlan Hall, Arizona St. (UPI-2)
 Dick Adams, Miami (AP-2)
 Norm Thompson, Utah (AP-2)
 Tim Priest, Tennessee (CP-2)

Special teams

Kickers 
 Happy Feller, Texas (PFW, TSN)
 Bill McClard, Arkansas (AFCA)

Punters 
 Marv Bateman, Utah (FWAA [kicker], TSN)
 Jim McCann, Arizona State (PFW)

Key

Official selectors

Other selectors

See also
 1970 All-Atlantic Coast Conference football team
 1970 All-Big Eight Conference football team
 1970 All-Big Ten Conference football team
 1970 All-Pacific-8 Conference football team
 1970 All-SEC football team
 1970 All-Southwest Conference football team

References

All-America Team
College Football All-America Teams